Rainbow Peak is located in the Livingston Range, Glacier National Park in the U.S. state of Montana. The namesake Rainbow Glacier is immediately east and northeast of Rainbow Peak.

In July 1998 the peak was the site of the death of two climbers who were climbing a snow-covered chimney when a cornice collapsed, causing the two climbers to fall to their deaths.

See also
 List of mountains and mountain ranges of Glacier National Park (U.S.)

References

Livingston Range
Mountains of Flathead County, Montana
Mountains of Glacier National Park (U.S.)
Mountains of Montana